Millville Football & Athletic Club also known as the Millville Big Blue was a professional football team based in Millville, New Jersey from 1921 until around 1928. The team won the mythical "Pro Football Championship of New Jersey" in 1923 and again in 1925. 

At end of the 1925, several members of the Big Blue traveled to Florida to play a series of exhibition games. After a game against the Tampa Cardinals, a team put together by the legendary Jim Thorpe, they took the name Haven-Villa of Winter Haven. During their time in Florida, the Big Blue comprised a 5-0-1 record.

Pro Football Hall of Fame
Guy Chamberlin

Other notable players
Punk Berryman
Rae Crowther
Leo Douglass
Gyp Downey
Carroll "Ginny" Gooch
Two-Bits Homan
Ben Jones
Elmer McCormick
Dinty Moore
Daddy Potts
Swede Youngstrom

References
Millville Football & Athletic Club
Millville Football & Athletic Club PFRA

Early professional American football teams in New Jersey
American football teams established in 1921
American football teams disestablished in 1928
Defunct American football teams in New Jersey
1921 establishments in New Jersey
1928 disestablishments in New Jersey